Bernard Hughes (18081878) was a nineteenth century Irish industrialist and politician.

He was born in Co. Armagh but moved to Belfast in 1826. Hughes set up his bakery in 1840 and by 1870 he had the largest baking and milling industry in Ireland. His continuing fame is due to his development and production of cheap and wholesome bread. The most famous item was the Belfast Bap, more commonly known as Barney's Baps. His bread is recalled in the rhyme:

Barney Hughes' bread
Sticks to your belly like lead.

His main mill was located in Divis Street in the lower Falls Road.

He was the first Catholic elected to Belfast Corporation. He campaigned against sectarianism and for social justice.  He gave evidence to the Royal Commission of Inquiry into the sectarian riots of 1857 and 1864 which angered the Tory establishment in the city. Although he was sometimes in conflict with the Catholic church he gave land for the building of St Peter's Cathedral in the Lower Falls area 

He is buried in Friar's Bush Graveyard - the oldest cemetery in Belfast.

References

Businesspeople from Belfast
Members of Belfast City Council
People from County Armagh
1808 births
1878 deaths
19th-century Irish philanthropists
19th-century Irish businesspeople